Dorothée Dupuis (born 1980, Paris) is a Feminist art curator, art critic, and publisher based in Mexico City.

Career
Dupuis holds a MFA from the HEAR (Haute école des arts du Rhin) in Strasbourg (2005). She was assistant curator at the Centre Georges Pompidou from 2005 to 2007. She was Director of Triangle France, a non-profit exhibition and residency program in Marseille, from 2007 to 2012. She was also Director of the French Feminist magazine Petunia starting in 2008. Dupuis is the founder of the online magazine Terremoto.mx, where she currently works as director and chief-editor.

Dupuis’s writings have been published in numerous art catalogues and publications and she is a regular contributor of Flash Art (Milan), Spike Art Daily (Vienna) and Crash Magazine (Paris).

Selected curation 
Cada vez que encuentro la muerte pienso en ti : Emmanuelle Lainé, IFAL, Mexico City, 2015.
 Moucharabieh, co-curated with Céline Kopp and Sandra Patron, Triangle France, Marseille, 2015.
 Yesterday : Renaud Jerez, Lodos, Mexico City, 2014. 
 20 million Mexicans can’t be wrong, panel discussion, Material Art Fair, Mexico City, 2014.
 Les Possédés, Triangle France, Marseille, 2012.
 K. Acker: The Office / Rulin 'n' freaking, cocurated with Géraldine Gourbe, Triangle France, Marseille, 2011.

Bibliography 
• La Start-Up, Les Ateliers des Arques, Lot, 2014.

References

External links
 Terremoto.mx 
 Triangle France 
 Petunia 
 Review of “Yesterday: Renaud Jerez" at Lodos Gallery, curated by Dorothée Dupuis 
 Review of “Les Possédé(e)s," curated by Dorothée Dupuis by Chris Sharp in Artforum January 2016. 
 DOROTHÉE interview par Luc Jeand’heur. Object de curiosités. September 2012. 
 Les 100 qui réinventent la culture: sélection arts. les inRocks. 23 juin 2015. 
 "Esculturas en imágenes." Excelsior. Sandra Sánchez. October 16, 2015. 
 Mathieu Clainchard. "Triangle France a 20 ans." zerodeux. 2015. 
 La Start-Up Journal (5) : Dorotée Dupuis Interview with Matthieu Laurette about "Tropicalize Me!" at Parallel Oaxaca
 “Act so there is no use of a center : (de)centering contemporary art in the digital age." Panel discussion organized by Dorothée Dupuis in co-production with Les Ateliers des Arques. September 10, 2014.

French curators
French women curators
French women art critics
1980 births
Living people
French art curators
French art critics
Lycée Fénelon Sainte-Marie alumni